Floortje  and Floor  are Dutch versions of the feminine given name Flora. People with the name include: 

Floortje
Floortje Dessing (born 1970), Dutch radio and television presenter, producer and travel writer
Floortje Engels (born 1982), Dutch field hockey player
Floortje Mackaij (born 1995), Dutch road racing cyclist
Floortje Meijners (born 1987), Dutch volleyball player
Floortje Smit (born 1983), Dutch pop singer
 (born 1974), Dutch children's book writer

Floor
Floor van den Brandt (born 1990), Dutch speed skater
Floor Jansen (born 1981), Dutch singer, songwriter, and vocal coach

Floor is also a now less common short form of the Dutch male given name Floris (or Florentianus, Florentinus, Florentius). For example:
 (1859–1936), Dutch businessman and politician

Dutch feminine given names